Henry du Toit is a South African rugby league player for the Bloemfontein Roosters. His position is centre. He is a South African international, and has played in the 2013 Rugby League World Cup qualifying against Jamaica and the USA.

References

NewsHandle.com

du Toit
du Toit
Bloemfontein Roosters players
Rugby league centres